KWYD (101.1 FM) is a radio station  broadcasting a rhythmic-leaning Top 40 (CHR) format. Licensed to Parma, Idaho, United States, the station is currently owned by Impact Radio Group.

History
The station was assigned the call sign KMCL on September 26, 1989, and on December 7, 2007 became adult contemporary KMXM.

The station was sold in early 2008 to Impact Radio Group, and later moved the station into the Boise radio market on October 31, 2008. It flipped the format to rhythmic contemporary, along with picking up the call letters KWYD. It also increased its power to 100,000 watts, giving the station better coverage in the area. KWYD is also Idaho's first ever Rhythmic-formatted station.

According to PD Mickey Fuentes in an interview for the Idaho Statesman, "This radio station is here because we saw a need for it in the market." He went on to say that "We looked around and said, 'Where's the opportunity here?'" Fuentes later added "All we're doing is trying to reflect the audience," and cites that the station received over 160,000 to 170,000 text messages per month for music requests and contests since its debut.

The KWYD-FM call sign was once used by a Colorado Springs, Colorado area radio station that had a Christian talk/music format in the 1970s and 1980s.  The station was sold in 1989 and the format and call letters were changed. Today it is known as KRDO-FM and broadcasts a news-talk format.

By mid-2011, KWYD-FM started to lean towards CHR. In mid-2012, KWYD-FM launched an hourly classic hip-hop/R&B block in consist of two songs during the top hour, replacing the former classic hip-hop/R&B block at 3PM weekday afternoons.

In early 2013, KWYD-FM trimmed the hourly classic hip-hop/R&B block, removing the evening hours in favor of nightly live DJ mixes. In 2014, KWYD-FM discontinued the hourly classic hip-hop/R&B block altogether, leaving the two hour block on Friday mornings from 8 AM to 10 AM, which had been debuted since the launch of KWYD, as the only available classic hip-hop/R&B format block in the Boise area. The Friday morning block also leaned towards rhythmic oldies material with post-disco, new jack swing, soul and funk formats exclusively to the block, which couldn't be heard on the former hourly top hour block. By mid-March of that same year however, it started to lean towards the current rhythmic material, and played only popular classic hip-hop/R&B material (similar to what they previously played on the former hourly top hour block) on a secondary basis during the block hours, other than the rhythmic oldies material, leaving Boise with no rhythmic oldies format on terrestrial radio.

In 2016, KWYD launched the "Throwback Lunch" block during the noon hours on weekdays, marking the return of the classic hip-hop/R&B format block, but it mostly leaned towards material from the 2000s, with selected popular material from the 1990s.

References

External links
www.wild101fm.com
www.myspace.com/wild 101.1

WYD
Rhythmic contemporary radio stations in the United States
Radio stations established in 1990
1990 establishments in Idaho